Vices and Virtues is the second studio album by Canadian rock band Art of Dying. It is the band's major label debut after signing under David Draiman and Dan Donegan's Intoxication records. Coincidentally, alternative rock band Panic! at the Disco released their third album, also titled Vices & Virtues (not counting the ampersand), on the same day. As of September 2014, Vices and Virtues has sold over 50,000 copies.

Track listing

Charts

Personnel
 Jonny Hetherington – vocals 
 Greg Bradley – guitar 
 Jeff Brown - drums 
 Cale Gontier - bass 
 Tavis Stanley - guitar
 Adam Gontier - additional vocals on "Raining"

References

2011 albums
Art of Dying (band) albums
Reprise Records albums
Albums produced by Howard Benson